The Sun Light 30 is a French sailboat that was designed by Daniel Andrieu as an International Offshore Rule Half Ton class racer-cruiser and first built in 1986.

The design was developed from a half-ton racer prototype and is similar to the Sun Odyssey 31 and the Sun Fast 31.

Production
The design was built by Jeanneau in France, from 1986 until 1991, with 932 boats completed, but it is now out of production.

Design
The Sun Light 30 is a recreational keelboat, built predominantly of solid polyester fiberglass, with a sandwich-construction deck and wood trim. It has a masthead sloop rig, with a deck-stepped mast, two sets of unswept spreaders and aluminum spars with stainless steel wire rigging. The hull has a raked stem, a walk though reverse transom, an internally mounted spade-type rudder, with a small skeg, controlled by a tiller and a fixed fin keel, shoal draft keel or stub keel and centerboard.

The fin keel model displaces  and carries  of lead ballast, the shoal draft keel model displaces  and carries  of cast iron ballast, while the centerboard version displaces  and carries  of exterior cast iron ballast with the centerboard made from steel.

A  shorter mast was an option.

The design has sleeping accommodation for six people, with a double "V"-berth in the bow cabin, two straight settees in the main cabin, or an optional "U" settee, and an aft cabin with a double berth on the port side. The galley is located on the port side just forward of the companionway ladder. The galley is "L"-shaped and is equipped with a two-burner stove, an ice box and a sink. An alternate galley is amidships and a straight configuration. A navigation station is opposite the galley, on the starboard side, or alternatively on the port side. The head is located aft of the companion way on the starboard side and includes a shower.

Operational history
The boat is supported by an active class club that organizes racing events, the Half Ton Class.

See also
List of sailing boat types

References

External links

Keelboats
1980s sailboat type designs
Sailing yachts
Sailboat type designs by Daniel Andrieu
Sailboat types built by Jeanneau